The Idle Rich is a 1921 American silent comedy film directed by Maxwell Karger. The film stars Bert Lytell, Virginia Valli, and John Davidson. It was released on December 26, 1921, by Metro Pictures. It is not known whether this film survives.

Plot
As described in a film magazine, Samuel Weatherbee (Lytell), a wealthy young man, is told by his sweetheart Mattie Walling (Valli) that his money is a liability instead of an asset. She favors Dillingham Coolidge, a poorer but industrious young man. However, when Sam's fortune is swept away by the suicide of his executor, he is cut off by his society friends and leaves San Francisco for a small property in San Diego that was left to him by an aunt. He finds the place filled with old and useless things, but conceives the idea of transferring them into cash by advertising a barter and exchange emporium. Soon he needs larger quarters and leases a valuable property in town from a former friend. Then, after his business grows and they want to get him out of the neighborhood, he makes them pay dearly for ending his lease. Eventually he wins back his sweetheart Mattie and his place in society.

Cast
 Bert Lytell as Samuel Weatherbee
 Virginia Valli as Mattie Walling
 John Davidson as Dillingham Coolidge
 Joseph Harrington as Judge O'Reilly
 Thomas Jefferson as Uncle Coolidge
 Victory Bateman as Mrs. O'Reilly
 Leigh Wyant as Jane Coolidge
 Max Davidson as the Tailor

References

External links

American silent feature films
American black-and-white films
Films directed by Maxwell Karger
Films based on short fiction
Silent American comedy films
1921 comedy films
Metro Pictures films
1921 films
1920s American films